Beverly Powell Long (April 18, 1933 – May 8, 2014) was an American film and television actress, notable credits include Rebel Without a Cause (1955), Cavalcade of America (1957) and Father Knows Best (1958–1960). She later worked as a casting director with her own company Beverly Long Casting.

Filmography

References

External links

1933 births
2014 deaths
Actresses from San Diego
American film actresses
American television actresses
20th-century American actresses
21st-century American women